David William Bryant is a South African politician serving as the Shadow Minister of Environment, Forestry and Fisheries since December 2020. He has been a Member of the National Assembly since September 2020, representing the  Democratic Alliance. Bryant was a proportional representation councillor of the City of Cape Town between 2009 and 2011, and then served as the ward councillor for ward 77 from 2011 to 2016. Bryant was the ward councillor for ward 115 from 2016 to 2020.

Early life and education
Bryant holds a BA degree in media studies from the University of Cape Town. He also fulfilled five short university courses on economics and planning. He also lived in the United Kingdom.

Political career
On 1 June 2009, Bryant was sworn in as a proportional representation councillor in the City of Cape Town representing the Democratic Alliance. He was elected as the ward councillor for ward 77 in May 2011. In August 2016, he was elected as the ward councillor for the newly created ward 115.

Parliamentary career
On 10 September 2020, Bryant was sworn in as a Member of the National Assembly of South Africa. He succeeded Thandi Mpambo-Sibhukwana, who had died in June.

Shadow Minister of Environment, Forestry and Fisheries
On 5 December 2020, Bryant was appointed Shadow Minister of Environment, Forestry and Fisheries in the new Shadow Cabinet led by John Steenhuisen. He became a member of the  Portfolio Committee on Environment, Forestry and Fisheries on 7 December.

Personal life
Bryant has two children.

References

External links
Mr David William Bryant – Parliament of South Africa

Living people
Year of birth missing (living people)
People from Cape Town
White South African people
Members of the National Assembly of South Africa
Democratic Alliance (South Africa) politicians
21st-century South African politicians
University of Cape Town alumni